Étalle (Lorrain: Ètaule) is a municipality of Wallonia located in the province of Luxembourg, Belgium. 

On 1 January 2007 the municipality, which covers 78.1 km2, had 5,389 inhabitants, giving a population density of 69 inhabitants per km2.

The municipality consists of the following districts: Buzenol, Chantemelle, Étalle, Sainte-Marie, Vance, and Villers-sur-Semois. Other population centers include: Croix Rouge, Fratin, Huombois, and Sivry.

See also
 List of protected heritage sites in Étalle, Belgium

References

External links
 

 
Municipalities of Luxembourg (Belgium)